Akademisk Boldklub are a Danish professional association football club based in Copenhagen, who currently play in the Danish 1st Division. They have played at their current home ground, the Gladsaxe Stadium, since 1938, but were founded much earlier, in 1889. They were one of the founding clubs of the Football Tournament in 1889. Since that time the club's first team has competed in numerous nationally and internationally-organised competitions.

All players who have played in 25 or more such matches are listed below. Players are listed according to the date of their first professional contract signed with the club. Appearances and goals are for first-team competitive matches only; wartime matches are excluded, substitute appearances are included.

The all-time appearance record is held by former Denmark international sweeper René Henriksen, who amassed 339 appearances in two spells with the club, first from 1988 to 1999, and then for one further season in 2005–06 after a six season tenure in Greece with Panathinaikos. Despite playing in a defensive role, Henriksen also holds the goalscoring record, with 42 goals. His nearest challenger in either field is former Nigeria international striker Abdul Sule, with 137 appearances and 30 goals between 2000 and 2004. Nicolai Stokholm also has 137 appearances.

List of players

 
Lists of association football players by club in Denmark
Players
Lists of Danish footballers
Association football player non-biographical articles